Iskay Ch'utu (Quechua iskay two, ch'utu cone, "two cones", also spelled Iskay Chuto) is a mountain in the Bolivian Andes which reaches a height of approximately . It is located in the Cochabamba Department, Mizque Province, Vila Vila Municipality. Iskay Ch'utu lies northeast of Jatun Urqu and southeast of Tikrasqa.

References 

Mountains of Cochabamba Department